Gard is a department in Southern France, located in the region of Occitanie. It had a population of 748,437 as of 2019; its prefecture is Nîmes. The department is named after the river Gardon; the Occitan name of the river, Gard, has been replacing the French name in recent decades, both administratively and among French speakers.

History 

The Gard area was settled by the Romans in classical times. It was crossed by the Via Domitia, which was constructed in 118 BC. Gard is one of the original 83 departments created during the French Revolution on 4 March 1790. It was created from the ancient province of Languedoc.

It was originally intended to include the canton of Ganges in the department which would have been geographically logical, but Ganges was transferred to the neighbouring department of Hérault at the outset. In return, Gard received from Hérault the fishing port of Aigues Mortes which gave the department its own outlet to the Gulf of Lion.

During the middle of the nineteenth century the prefecture, traditionally a centre of commerce with a manufacturing sector focused on textiles, was an early beneficiary of railway development, becoming an important railway junction.   Several luxurious hotels were built, and the improved market access provided by the railways also encouraged, initially, a rapid growth in wine growing:  however, many of the department's viticulturalists were ruined by the arrival in 1872 of phylloxera.

Geography 

Gard is part of the region of Occitanie and is surrounded by the departments of Hérault, Lozère, Aveyron, Bouches-du-Rhône, Vaucluse and Ardèche. It also have a short coastline within the Mediterranean Sea in the south. The highest point in the department is the Mont Aigoual. Serious flooding has occurred in the department in recent years, and, due to its geographic setting, it has been the site of some of the highest recorded temperatures in France's history.

Demographics 
Population development since 1791:

The inhabitants of Gard are called "Gardois". The most populous commune is Nîmes, the prefecture. As of 2019, there are 8 communes with more than 10,000 inhabitants:

Politics
In the closely contested first round of the 2012 presidential election, Gard was the only department to vote for the National Front candidate Marine Le Pen by a slim plurality, with 25.51% of the vote. The incumbent President Nicolas Sarkozy of the Union for a Popular Movement party received 24.86% of the vote, while Socialist candidate François Hollande received 24.11% of the vote share.

Departmental Council

The President of the Departmental Council has been Françoise Laurent-Perrigot of the Socialist Party (PS) since 2021.

Members of the National Assembly
In the 2017 legislative election, Gard elected the following representatives to the National Assembly:

Tourism 
Gard contains a part of the Cévennes National Park. There are important Roman architectural remains in Nîmes, as well as the famous Roman aqueduct, the Pont du Gard.

Gard is also home to the source of Perrier, a carbonated mineral water sold both in France and internationally on a large scale. The spring and facility are located just south-east of the commune of Vergèze.

See also
 Arrondissements of the Gard department
 Cantons of the Gard department
 Communes of the Gard department

References

External links 

  Prefecture website
  Departmental Council website
  Welcome to the Gard
  Welcome to the Gard
  Guide Gard

 
1790 establishments in France
Departments of Occitania (administrative region)
States and territories established in 1790
Massif Central